Punch Brothers is an American band consisting of Chris Thile (mandolin), Gabe Witcher (fiddle/violin), Noam Pikelny (banjo), Chris Eldridge (guitar), and Paul Kowert (bass). Their style has been described as "bluegrass instrumentation and spontaneity in the strictures of modern classical" as well as "American country-classical chamber music".

The band's 2018 album All Ashore was awarded the Grammy Award for Best Folk Album at the 61st Grammy Awards on February 10, 2019.

History

2006–2007: Beginnings
Thile formed the band in 2006 to record the album How to Grow a Woman from the Ground. In an interview with the Nashville City Paper, Thile described the formation of the band:

The band was initially known as The How to Grow a Band. In 2007, they officially changed their name, first to The Tensions Mountain Boys, before settling on Punch Brothers. The band's name comes from the critical line of an earworm jingle that is the centerpiece of Mark Twain's short story "A Literary Nightmare". The chorus of the jingle consists of two lines, "Punch, brothers! punch with care! Punch in the presence of the passenjare," which are said to be the mantra of railroad conductors.

What they formed was a type of group that American Songwriter magazine calls "A 21st century version of the Bluegrass Boys."

2007–2009: "The Blind Leaving the Blind" and Punch

On March 17, 2007, this group debuted the ambitious forty-minute suite, "The Blind Leaving the Blind" at Carnegie Hall. The piece was composed by Thile, who said he wrote it in part to deal with his divorce in 2003.

On February 13, 2008, the band set off on their first national tour as Punch Brothers. On February 26, they released Punch, their first album, on Nonesuch Records. The album features Thile's suite "The Blind Leaving the Blind", as well as other original songs.

In March 2008, when asked about a follow-up album, Thile said "there will definitely be another album." On November 8, 2008, the band announced on their website that they had parted ways with bass player Greg Garrison. Paul Kowert, who studied under Edgar Meyer at the Curtis Institute of Music, took Garrison's place as bass player.

2010: Antifogmatic
Antifogmatic, Punch Brothers' second album, was released on June 15, 2010 and features both traditional bluegrass and newgrass styles on the ten-track listing. Though bassist Kowert had toured extensively with the band in support of Punch over the preceding two years, Antifogmatic is the first Punch Brothers album on which he appears.

2011: How to Grow A Band documentary
The band is also the focus of the documentary How to Grow a Band, directed by Mark Meatto. It was filmed over a two-year period and, according to its website, "explores the tensions between individual talents and group identity, art and commerce, youth and wisdom". The film premiered at the 42nd Nashville Film Festival in Nashville, Tennessee on April 15, 2011. The film also screened as part of the 38th Annual Telluride Bluegrass Festival in June 2011.

2012: Who's Feeling Young Now?
The band released its third album, Who's Feeling Young Now?, in February 2012. Shortly afterwards, they contributed the song 'Dark Days' to the soundtrack for 2012 blockbuster The Hunger Games. In November 2012 they released Ahoy!, the 5-track EP companion to Who's Feeling Young Now? The EP consists of five songs that were not featured on the full-length release.

2015: The Phosphorescent Blues and The Wireless
In November 2014, the band released the first single, entitled "I Blew It Off," from their then-untitled fourth album. In December 2014, the band announced that the new album, The Phosphorescent Blues, would be released on January 27, 2015, along with the immediate release of another new single, "Julep". Julep was nominated for Best American Roots Song at the 2016 Grammy Awards. The album reached the top 10 on the rock, folk, and bluegrass charts. On November 20, 2015, Punch Brothers released a 5-track EP, The Wireless.

2018: All Ashore 
On July 20, 2018, All Ashore was released as the band's fifth album. The album was self-produced and released on the Nonesuch Records label. According to Thile, the album is "a meditation on committed relationships in the present day, particularly in light of the current unsettled political climate—certainly the most unsettled one that anyone in the band has ever experienced. We were hoping we could create a thing that would be convincing as a complete thought, sort of a nine-movement or a nine-song thought, even though it's rangy in terms of what it's talking about and in the characters doing the talking."

All Ashore was awarded the Grammy Award for Best Folk Album at the 61st Grammy Awards on February 10, 2019.

2022: Hell on Church Street 
On September 28, 2021 Punch Brothers announced that their next studio album would be a re-imagining of Tony Rice's 1983 album Church Street Blues. The album, titled Hell on Church Street, released on January 14, 2022. 

Rice's Church Street Blues was a solo folk reinterpretation of many classic songs, and the Punch Brothers said of their own reinterpretations "No record (or musician) has had a greater impact on us, and we felt compelled to cover it in its entirety, with the objective of interacting with it in the same spirit of respect-fueled adventure that Tony brought to each of its pre-existing songs.” The songs were recorded in November 2020, just weeks before Rice's death at age 69. Punch Brothers guitarist Chris Eldridge was a student of Rice's.

Band members

Current members
Chris Thile – mandolin, vocals, mandola, bouzouki
Gabe Witcher – fiddle, vocals, drums
Noam Pikelny – banjo, vocals, National steel-bodied guitar
Chris Eldridge – guitar, vocals
Paul Kowert – double bass, vocals (since 2008)

Former members
Bryan Sutton – guitar, vocals (2006–2007)
Greg Garrison – double bass, vocals (2006–2008)

Discography

Albums

Music videos

References

External links

 

Musical groups established in 2006
American bluegrass music groups
American country music groups
American street performers
Nonesuch Records artists
Progressive bluegrass music groups